Yermolino is a town in Borovsky District of Kaluga Oblast, Russia. Population:

History
Town status was granted to Yermolino on December 29, 2004.

Administrative and municipal status
Within the framework of administrative divisions, Yermolino is subordinated to Borovsky District. As a municipal division, the town of Yermolino is incorporated within Borovsky Municipal District as Yermolino Urban Settlement.

References

Notes

Sources

Cities and towns in Kaluga Oblast